There have been four baronies and one viscountcy created in the name of Lovel or Lovell.

Baron Lovel, of Titchmarsh (England, 6 February 1299)

 John Lovel, 1st Baron Lovel (1254–1311)
 John Lovel, 2nd Baron Lovel (1289–k.1314), died at Bannockburn
 John Lovel, 3rd Baron Lovel (d. 1347)
 John Lovel, 4th Baron Lovel (1340–1361)
 John Lovel, 5th Baron Lovel, KG (1341–1408)
 John Lovel, 6th Baron Lovel (d. 1414)
 William Lovel, 7th Baron Lovel and 4th Baron Holand (1397–1454)
 John Lovel, 8th Baron Lovel and 5th Baron Holand (1432–1465)
 Francis Lovel, 9th Baron Lovel, 6th Baron Holand and 1st Viscount Lovel (1456–1487), created Viscount Lovel 1483, titles forfeit 1485
Upton Lovell in Wiltshire and Minster Lovell in Oxfordshire are named for these barons.

Baron Lovel, of Castle Cary (England, 20 November 1348)
 Richard Lovel, 1st Baron Lovel (d. 1351), extinct on his death

Viscount Lovel (England, 4 January 1483)
 Francis Lovel, 1st Viscount Lovel (1456–1487), forfeit 1485

Baron Lovel, of Minster Lovell (Great Britain, 28 May 1728)
 Thomas Coke, 1st Baron Lovel (1697–1759), created Earl of Leicester 1744, titles extinct on his death

Baron Lovel and Holland, of Enmore (Great Britain, 7 May 1762)
 John Perceval, 2nd Earl of Egmont (1711–1770)
 held until 2011 by the Earl of Egmont

See also
 Baron Holand
 Baron Morley

References

 

1299 establishments in England
Extinct baronies in the Peerage of England
Forfeited baronies in the Peerage of England
Noble titles created in 1299
Noble titles created in 1348
Noble titles created in 1728
Noble titles created in 1762